Merced Grove is a giant sequoia grove located about  west of Crane Flat in the Merced River watershed of Yosemite National Park, California.

The grove hosts about 20 large trees with a relatively open understory, and are spread out over the last  of the trail.

See also
List of giant sequoia groves
Tuolumne Grove - a nearby giant sequoia grove

References

Giant sequoia groves
Yosemite National Park